Ig gamma-1 chain C region is a protein that in humans is encoded by the IGHG1 gene.

References

Further reading